Friday Night Lights is an American sports drama television series developed by Peter Berg from a book and film of the same name. The series details events surrounding a high school football team from a fictional town called Dillon: a small, close-knit community in rural Texas. Particular focus is given to team coach Eric Taylor (Kyle Chandler) and his family.

Series overview

Episodes

Season 1 (2006–07)

Season 2 (2007–08)

Season 3 (2008–09)

Season 4 (2009–10)

Season 5 (2010–11)

References

External links
 List of Friday Night Lights episodes at NBC
 

Episodes
Friday Night Lights

it:Friday Night Lights (serie televisiva)#Episodi